Henry Fork is a  long 4th order tributary to South Fork Catawba River in Burke and Catawba Counties, North Carolina.

Variant names
According to the Geographic Names Information System, it has also been known historically as:  
Henrixy River
Henrys River

Course
Henry Fork rises about 0.25 miles southeast of Propst Mountain in Burke County, North Carolina.  Henry Fork then flows northeast into Catawba County then southeast to form South Fork Catawba River with Jacob Fork about 3 miles southwest of Startown.

Watershed
Henry Fork drains  of area, receives about 51.1 in/year of precipitation, has a topographic wetness index of 310.54 and is about 65% forested.

See also
List of North Carolina rivers

References

Tributaries of the Catawba River
Rivers of North Carolina
Rivers of Burke County, North Carolina
Rivers of Catawba County, North Carolina
Hickory, North Carolina